U.S. Virgin Islands competed at the 2019 World Athletics Championships in Doha, Qatar, from 27 September–6 October 2019. U.S. Virgin Islands had entered 1 athlete.

Result

Men
Track and road events

References

External links
Doha｜WCH 19｜World Athletics

2019 in United States Virgin Islands sports
U.S. Virgin Islands
2019